Spiess Rocks is a group of submerged rocks which extend up to 0.4 nautical miles (0.7 km) northeast of Cape Lollo on the island of Bouvetøya. First charted in December 1927 by a Norwegian expedition under Captain Harald Horntvedt. Named by the Norwegians for Captain Fritz A. Spiess, leader of the German expedition which visited Bouvetoya on board the "Meteor" in 1926.

References

Other sources
Simpson-Housley, Paul  (2002)	Antarctica: Exploration, Perception and Metaphor	(Routledge) 

Rock formations of Bouvet Island